North Dakota is a U.S. state in the Upper Midwest, named after the indigenous Dakota Sioux. North Dakota is bordered by the Canadian provinces of Saskatchewan and Manitoba to the north and by the U.S. states of Minnesota to the east, South Dakota to the south, and Montana to the west. It is believed to host the geographic center of North America, Rugby, and is home to the tallest man-made structure in the Western Hemisphere, the KVLY-TV mast.

North Dakota is the 19th largest state, but with a population of less than 780,000 as of 2020, it is the 4th least populous and 4th most sparsely populated. The capital is Bismarck while the largest city is Fargo, which accounts for nearly a fifth of the state's population; both cities are among the fastest-growing in the U.S., although half of all residents live in rural areas. The state is part of the Great Plains region, with broad prairies, steppe, temperate savanna, badlands, and farmland being defining characteristics.

What is now North Dakota was inhabited for thousands of years by various Native American tribes, including the Mandan, Hidatsa, and Arikara along the Missouri River; the Ojibwa and Cree in the northeast; and several Sioux groups (the Assiniboine, Yankton, Wahpeton, and Teton) across the rest of the state. European explorers and traders first arrived in the early 18th century, mostly in pursuit of lucrative furs. The United States acquired the region in the early 19th century, gradually settling it amid growing resistance by increasingly displaced natives.

The Dakota Territory, established in 1861, became central to American pioneers, with the Homestead Act of 1862 precipitating significant population growth and development. The traditional fur trade declined in favor of farming, particularly of wheat; the subsequent Dakota Boom from 1878 to 1886 saw giant farms stretched across the rolling prairies, with the territory becoming a key breadbasket and regional economic engine. The Northern Pacific and Great Northern railway companies competed for access to lucrative grain centers; farmers banded together in political and socioeconomic alliances that were core to the broader Populist Movement of the Midwest.

North Dakota was admitted to the Union on November 2, 1889, along with neighboring South Dakota, as the 39th and 40th states. President Benjamin Harrison shuffled the statehood papers before signing them so that no one could tell which became a state first; consequently, the two states are officially numbered in alphabetical order. Statehood marked the gradual winding down of the pioneer period, with the state fully settled by around 1920. Subsequent decades saw a rise in radical agrarian movements and economic cooperatives, of which one legacy is the Bank of North Dakota, the only state-run bank in the U.S.

Beginning in the mid 20th century, North Dakota's rich natural resources became more critical to economic development; into the 21st century, oil extraction from the Bakken formation in the northwest has played a major role in the state's prosperity. Such development has led to unprecedented population growth (along with high birth rates) and reduced unemployment, with North Dakota having the second lowest unemployment rate in the U.S. (after Hawaii).  It ranks relatively well in metrics such as infrastructure, quality of life, economic opportunity, and public safety.

History

Pre-colonial history

Native American people lived in what is now North Dakota for thousands of years before the arrival of Europeans. The known tribes included the Mandan people (from around the 11th century), while the first Hidatsa group arrived a few hundred years later. They both assembled in villages on tributaries of the Missouri River in what would become west-central North Dakota. Crow Indians traveled the plains from the west to visit and trade with the related Hidatsas after the split between them, probably in the 17th century.

Later came divisions of the Dakota people: the Lakota, the Santee and the Yanktonai. The Assiniboine and the Plains Cree undertook southward journeys to the village Indians, either for trade or for war. The Shoshone Indians in present-day Wyoming and Montana may have carried out attacks on Indian enemies as far east as the Missouri. A group of Cheyennes lived in a village of earth lodges at the lower Sheyenne River (Biesterfeldt Site) for decades in the 18th century.

Due to attacks by Crees, Assiniboines and Chippewas armed with fire weapons, they left the area around 1780 and crossed Missouri some time after. A band of the few Sotaio Indians lived east of Missouri River and met the uprooted Cheyennes before the end of the century. They soon followed the Cheyennes across Missouri and lived among them south of Cannonball River.

Eventually, the Cheyenne and the Sutaio became one tribe and turned into mounted buffalo hunters with ranges mainly outside North Dakota. Before the middle of the 19th century, the Arikara entered the future state from the south and joined the Mandan and Hidatsa. With time, a number of Indians entered into treaties with the United States. Many of the treaties defined the territory of a specific tribe.

European exploration and colonization

The first European to reach the area was the French-Canadian trader Pierre Gaultier, sieur de La Vérendrye, who led an exploration and trading party to the Mandan villages in 1738 guided by Assiniboine Indians.
 
From 1762 to 1802, the region formed part of Spanish Louisiana.

Settlement and statehood

European Americans settled in Dakota Territory only sparsely until the late 19th century, when railroads opened up the region. With the advantage of grants of land, they vigorously marketed their properties, extolling the region as ideal for agriculture.

Differences between the northern and southern part caused resentments between the settlers. The northern part was seen by the more populated southern part as somewhat disreputable, "too much controlled by the wild folks, cattle ranchers, fur traders” and too frequently the site of conflict with the indigenous population. The northern part was generally content with remaining a territory. However, following the territorial capital being moved from Yankton in the southern part to Bismarck, the southern part began to call for division. Finally, at the 1887 territorial election, the voters approved splitting the territory into two. The division was done by the seventh standard parallel.

Congress passed an omnibus bill for statehood for North Dakota, South Dakota, Montana, and Washington, titled the Enabling Act of 1889, on February 22, 1889, during the administration of President Grover Cleveland. His successor, Benjamin Harrison, signed the proclamations formally admitting North Dakota and South Dakota to the Union on November 2, 1889.

The rivalry between the two new states presented a dilemma of which was to be admitted first. Harrison directed Secretary of State James G. Blaine to shuffle the papers and obscure from him which he was signing first. The actual order went unrecorded, thus no one knows which of the Dakotas was admitted first. However, since North Dakota alphabetically appears before South Dakota, its proclamation was published first in the Statutes At Large.

20th and 21st centuries

Unrest among wheat farmers, especially among Norwegian immigrants, led to a populist political movement centered in the Non Partisan League ("NPL") around the time of World War I. The NPL ran candidates on the Republican ticket (but merged into the Democratic Party after World War II). It tried to insulate North Dakota from the power of out-of-state banks and corporations.

In addition to founding the state-owned Bank of North Dakota and North Dakota Mill and Elevator (both still in existence), the NPL established a state-owned railroad line (later sold to the Soo Line Railroad). Anti-corporate laws virtually prohibited a corporation or bank from owning title to land zoned as farmland. These laws, still in force today, after having been upheld by state and federal courts, make it almost impossible to foreclose on farmland, as even after foreclosure, the property title cannot be held by a bank or mortgage company. Furthermore, the Bank of North Dakota, having powers similar to a Federal Reserve branch bank, exercised its power to limit the issuance of subprime mortgages and their collateralization in the form of derivative instruments, and so prevented a collapse of housing prices within the state in the wake of 2008's financial crisis.

The original North Dakota State Capitol in Bismarck burned to the ground on December 28, 1930. It was replaced by a limestone-faced art-deco skyscraper that still stands today. A round of federal investment and construction projects began in the 1950s, including the Garrison Dam and the Minot and Grand Forks Air Force bases.

Western North Dakota saw a boom in oil exploration in the late 1970s and early 1980s, as rising petroleum prices made development profitable. This boom came to an end after petroleum prices declined.

In recent years, the state has had lower rates of unemployment than the national average, and increased job and population growth. Much of the growth has been based on development of the Bakken oil fields in the western part of the state. Estimates as to the remaining amount of oil in the area vary, with some estimating over 100 years' worth.

For decades, North Dakota's annual murder and violent crime rates were regularly the lowest in the United States. In recent years, however, while still below the national average, crime has risen sharply. In 2016, the violent crime rate was three times higher than in 2004, with the rise occurring mostly in the late 2000s, coinciding with the oil boom era. This happened at a time when the national violent crime rate declined slightly. Workers in the oil boom towns have been blamed for much of the increase.

Geography

North Dakota is located in the Upper Midwest region of the United States. It lies at the center of the North American continent and borders Canada to the north. The geographic center of North America is near the town of Center. Bismarck is the capital of North Dakota, and Fargo is the largest city.

Soil is North Dakota's most precious resource. It is the base of the state's great agricultural wealth. North Dakota also has enormous mineral resources. These mineral resources include billions of tons of lignite coal. In addition, North Dakota has large oil reserves. Petroleum was discovered in the state in 1951 and quickly became one of North Dakota's most valuable mineral resources. In the early 2000s, the emergence of hydraulic fracturing technologies enabled mining companies to extract huge amounts of oil from the Bakken shale rock formation in the western part of the state.

North Dakota's economy is based more heavily on farming than the economies of most other states. Many North Dakota factories process farm products or manufacture farm equipment. Many of the state's merchants also rely on agriculture. North Dakota 2022 Economic Outlook Rank: 9th Economic Performance Rank Rank: 14th. The pandemic also triggered mass job losses in the state. Though North Dakota’s unemployment rate of 4.4% is below the 6.0% national rate, it is nearly double what it was this time last year.

Farms and ranches cover nearly all of North Dakota. They stretch from the flat Red River Valley in the east, across rolling plains, to the rugged Badlands in the west. The chief crop, wheat, is grown in nearly every county. North Dakota harvests more than 90 percent of the nation's canola and flaxseed. It is also the country's top producer of barley and sunflower seeds and a leader in the production of beans, honey, lentils, oats, peas, and sugar beets.

Few white settlers came to the North Dakota region before the 1870s because railroads had not yet entered the area. During the early 1870s, the Northern Pacific Railroad began to push across the Dakota Territory. Large-scale farming also began during the 1870s. Eastern corporations and some families established huge wheat farms covering large areas of land in the Red River Valley. The farms made such enormous profits they were called bonanza farms. White settlers, attracted by the success of the bonanza farms, flocked to North Dakota, rapidly increasing the territory's population. In 1870, North Dakota had 2,405 people. By 1890, the population had grown to 190,983.

North Dakota was named for the Sioux people who once lived in the territory. The Sioux called themselves Dakota or Lakota, meaning allies or friends. One of North Dakota's nicknames is the Peace Garden State. This nickname honors the International Peace Garden, which lies on the state's border with Manitoba, Canada. North Dakota is also called the Flickertail State because of the many flickertail ground squirrels (Richardson's ground squirrel) that live in the central part of the state.

North Dakota is in the U.S. region known as the Great Plains. The state shares the Red River of the North with Minnesota to the east. South Dakota is to the south, Montana is to the west, and the Canadian provinces of Saskatchewan and Manitoba are to the north. North Dakota is near the middle of North America with a stone marker in Rugby, North Dakota marking the "Geographic Center of the North American Continent".

The western half of the state consists of the hilly Great Plains as well as the northern part of the Badlands, which are to the west of the Missouri River. The region is abundant in fossil fuels including natural gas, crude oil and lignite coal. The Missouri River forms Lake Sakakawea, the third largest artificial lake in the United States, behind the Garrison Dam.

The central region of the state is divided into the Drift Prairie and the Missouri Plateau. The eastern part of the state consists of the flat Red River Valley, the bottom of glacial Lake Agassiz. Its fertile soil, drained by the meandering Red River flowing northward into Lake Winnipeg, supports a large agriculture industry. Devils Lake, the largest natural lake in the state, is also found in the east.

Most of the state is covered in grassland; crops cover most of eastern North Dakota but become increasingly sparse in the center and farther west. Natural trees in North Dakota are found usually where there is good drainage, such as the ravines and valley near the Pembina Gorge and Killdeer Mountains, the Turtle Mountains, the hills around Devils Lake, in the dunes area of McHenry County in central North Dakota, and along the Sheyenne Valley slopes and the Sheyenne delta. This diverse terrain supports nearly 2,000 species of plants. 

North Dakota public lands 5 national parks, 5 state forests, 63 national wildlife refuges, 3 national grassland, and 13 state parks plus there are state trust land, bureau of land management, waterfowl production areas, bureau of reclamation, bureau of land management, U.S. Army Corps of Engineers, state wildlife management areas

North Dakota wildlife 

Currently there are 36 Level I species, 44 Level II species, and 35 Level III species. 

List of birds of North Dakota The basic NDGFD list contains 420 confirmed and extant species, two extinct species. Three additional species have been added from the North Dakota Bird Records Committee (NDBRC) review list with some additions from Avibase. The combined lists contain 420 species. Of them, 194 and a subspecies are on the review list (see below). The NDGFD list considers 44 species to be accidental, and eight species have been introduced to North America. 

List of mammals of North Dakota 87 species are known to live in the state. This includes mammals that are currently extirpated or locally extinct in North Dakota such as the gray wolf, swift fox, caribou and grizzly bear. 

List of insects of North Dakota    1,126 Species known in North Dakota       

List of fish of North Dakota  98 Species are currently known in North Dakota 

List of reptiles/amphibians of North Dakota           16 Species of Reptiles and 12 Amphibians found in the state. 

List of crustaceans/mussels of North Dakota   

 Three species of crawfish are found in North Dakota: Devil, Calico, and Virile                             

North Dakota is home to three freshwater shrimp species, gammarus, hyalella and mysis. The latter is an introduced species stocked in Lake Sakakawea in the early 1970s to add to the forage base.

 Cvancara’s Aquatic Mussels of North Dakota from 1983. He documented 13 species of what are generally referred to as clams in the state along with 13 species of pill clams, which are very small clams, in the order of a few millimeters in length. He also documented 22 species of snails in the state.

Climate

North Dakota has a continental climate with warm summers and cold winters. The temperature differences are significant because of its far inland position and being roughly equal distance from the North Pole and the Equator.

Monthly maximum and minimum temperatures (°F/°C) in North Dakota 

North Dakota holds 12 hour temperature rise record 

In 12 hours: 83°F, Granville, N.D., Feb. 21, 1918, from –33°F to 50°F from early morning to late afternoon.

Langdon, North Dakota, was the epicenter of the cold wave of 1936: 

It remained below freezing (day and night) for 92 consecutive days, from November 30 through February 29 Langdon’s warmest February temperature was a frigid 15° 

Langdon holds the record for: below 0° 41 consecutive days, January 11 though February 20. This is a record for any location in the contiguous U.S.

Demographics

Population

At the 2022 estimate North Dakota's population was 779,261 on July 1, 2022, a 0.02% decrease since the 2020 United States census. This makes North Dakota the U.S. state with the largest percentage in population growth since 2011. North Dakota is the fourth least-populous state in the country; only Alaska, Vermont, and Wyoming have fewer residents.

From fewer than 2,000 people in 1870, North Dakota's population grew to near 680,000 by 1930. Growth then slowed, and the population has fluctuated slightly over the past seven decades, hitting a low of 617,761 in the 1970 census, with 642,200 in the 2000 census. Except for Native Americans, the North Dakota population has a lesser percentage of minorities than in the nation as a whole. As of 2011, 20.7% of North Dakota's population younger than age1 were minorities. The center of population of North Dakota is in Wells County, near Sykeston.

According to HUD's 2022 Annual Homeless Assessment Report, there were an estimated 610 homeless people in North Dakota.

Race and ethnicity

Note: Births in table don't add up, because Hispanics are counted both by their ethnicity and by their race, giving a higher overall number.

Since 2016, data for births of White Hispanic origin are not collected, but included in one Hispanic group; persons of Hispanic origin may be of any race.

Throughout the mid-19th century, Dakota Territory was still dominated by Native Americans; warfare and disease reduced their population at the same time Europeans and Americans were settling in the area. Throughout the latter half of the nineteenth century and into the early twentieth century, North Dakota, along with most of the Midwest U.S., experienced a mass influx of newcomers from both the eastern United States and immigrants from Europe. North Dakota was a known popular destination for immigrant farmers and general laborers and their families, mostly from Norway, Iceland, Sweden, Germany and the United Kingdom. Much of this settlement gravitated throughout the western side of the Red River Valley, as was similarly seen in South Dakota and in a parallel manner in Minnesota. This area is well known for its fertile lands. By the outbreak of the First World War, this was among North America's richest farming regions. But a period of higher rainfall ended, and many migrants weren't successful in the arid conditions. Many family plots were too small to farm successfully.

From the 1930s until the end of the 20th century, North Dakota's population gradually declined, interrupted by a couple of brief increases. Young adults with university degrees were particularly likely to leave the state. With the advancing process of mechanization of agricultural practices, and environmental conditions requiring larger landholdings for successful agriculture, subsistence farming proved to be too risky for families. Many people moved to urban areas for jobs.

Since the late 20th century, one of the major causes of migration from North Dakota is the lack of skilled jobs for college graduates. Expansion of economic development programs has been urged to create skilled and high-tech jobs, but the effectiveness of such programs has been open to debate. During the first decade of the 21st century, the population increased in large part because of jobs in the oil industry related to development of unconventional tight oil (shale oil) fields. Elsewhere, the Native American population has increased as some reservations have attracted people back from urban areas.

According to the 2010 U.S. census, the racial and ethnic composition of North Dakota was 88.7% non-Hispanic white, 5.4% Native American, 1.2% Black or African American, 1.0% Asian, 0.1% Pacific Islander, 0.5% some other race, and 0.2% from two or more races. At the 2019 American Community Survey, North Dakota's racial and ethnic makeup was 83.6% non-Hispanic white, 2.9% Black or African American, 5.0% Native American and Alaska Native, 1.4% Asian, 0.4% Native Hawaiian or other Pacific Islander, 0.1% some other race, 2.7% multiracial, and 4.0% Hispanic or Latin American of any race.

North Dakota is one of the top resettlement locations for refugees proportionally. According to the U.S. Office of Refugee Resettlement, in 2013–2014 "more than 68 refugees" per 100,000 North Dakotans were settled in the state. In fiscal year 2014, 582 refugees settled in the state. Fargo Mayor Mahoney said North Dakota accepting the most refugees per capita should be celebrated given the benefits they bring to the state. In 2015, Lutheran Social Services of North Dakota, the state's only resettlement agency, was "awarded $458,090 in federal funding to improve refugee services". 29.8% of immigrants in North Dakota are from Africa leading to a rapid increase in the black proportion of the population in recent decades from 0.6% in 2000 to 3.9% in 2020.

Immigration from outside the United States resulted in a net increase of 3,323 people, and migration within the country produced a net loss of 21,110 people. Of the residents of North Dakota in 2009, 69.8% were born in North Dakota, 27.2% were born in a different state, 0.6% were born in Puerto Rico, U.S. Island areas, or born abroad to American parent(s), and 2.4% were born in another country. The age and gender distributions approximate the national average. In 2019, 4.1% were foreign-born residents.

Languages

In 2010, 94.86% (584,496) of North Dakotans over 5 years old spoke English as their primary language. 5.14% (31,684) of North Dakotans spoke a language other than English. 1.39% (8,593) spoke German, 1.37% (8,432) spoke Spanish, and 0.30% (1,847) spoke Norwegian. Other languages spoken included Serbo-Croatian (0.19%), Chinese and Japanese (both 0.15%), and Native American languages and French (both 0.13%). In 2000, 2.5% of the population spoke German in addition to English, reflecting early 20th century immigration.

Religion

The Pew Research Center determined 77% of the adult population was Christian in 2014. In contrast with many southern U.S. states, mainline Protestantism was the largest form of Protestantism practiced (28%). The largest mainline Protestant denomination in North Dakota was the Evangelical Lutheran Church in America, and the United Methodist Church was the second largest. Evangelical Protestants, forming the second largest Protestant branch (22%), were also dominated by Lutherans; the Lutheran Church–Missouri Synod was the largest Evangelical denomination. Among the Christian population of North Dakota, the Roman Catholic Church was the single largest Christian denomination. According to the Public Religion Research Institute in 2020, 75% of the adult population were Christian, with mainline Protestantism remaining the majority and evangelical Protestantism at 18% of the population.

Per the Pew Research Center in 2014, non-Christian religions accounted for 3% of the adult population, with Islam being the largest non-Christian religion. Other faiths such as Unitarians and New Agers collectively made up 1% of the practicing population. At the 2014 survey, 20% were unaffiliated with any religion, and 2% of North Dakotans were atheist; 13% of the population practiced nothing in particular. The 2020 Public Religion Research Institute's survey determined 22% were unaffiliated with any religion.

The largest church bodies by number of adherents in 2010 were the Roman Catholic Church with 167,349; the Evangelical Lutheran Church in America with 163,209; and the Lutheran Church–Missouri Synod with 22,003. In 2006, North Dakota had the most churches per capita of any state. Additionally, North Dakota had the highest percentage of church-going population of any state in 2006.

A 2001 survey indicated 35% of North Dakota's population was Lutheran, and 30% was Catholic. Other religious groups represented were Methodists (7%), Baptists (6%), the Assemblies of God (3%), Presbyterians (1.27%), and Jehovah's Witnesses (1%). Christians with unstated or other denominational affiliations, including other Protestants and the Church of Jesus Christ of Latter-day Saints (LDS Church), totaled 3%, bringing the total Christian population to 86%. There were an estimated 920 Muslims and 730 Jews in the state in 2000. Three percent of respondents answered "no religion" on the survey, and 6% declined to answer.

Economy

Agriculture is North Dakota's largest industry, although petroleum, food processing, and technology are also major industries. Its growth rate is about 4.1%. According to the U.S. Bureau of Economic Analysis the economy of North Dakota had a gross domestic product of $55.180 billion in the second quarter of 2018. The per capita income for the state was $34,256, when measured from 2013 to 2017 by the United States Department of Commerce. The three-year median household income from 2013 to 2017 was $61,285.

According to Gallup data, North Dakota led the U.S. in job creation in 2013 and has done so since 2009. The state has a Job Creation Index score of 40, nearly 10 points ahead of its nearest competitors. North Dakota has added 56,600 private-sector jobs since 2011, creating an annual growth rate of 7.32 percent. According to statistics released in December 2020, by the Bureau of Economic Analysis, North Dakota had the highest rate of annual growth in personal consumption expenditures of all 50 states, from 2009-2018.  During this time period, annual nominal personal income growth averaged 6% per year, compared to the U.S. average of 4.4%. North Dakota's personal income growth is tied to various private business sectors such as agriculture, energy development, and construction. North Dakota also had the highest growth in personal expenditures on housing and utilities of all states, reflecting the sharply increased demand for housing in the 2010s.

Just over 21% of North Dakota's total 2013 gross domestic product (GDP) of $49.77 billion comes from natural resources and mining.

North Dakota is the only state with a state-owned bank, the Bank of North Dakota in Bismarck, and a state-owned flour mill, the North Dakota Mill and Elevator in Grand Forks. These were established by the NPL before World War II.

As of 2012, Fargo is home to the second-largest campus of Microsoft with 1,700 employees, and Amazon.com employs several hundred in Grand Forks.

, the state's unemployment rate is among the lowest in the nation at 2.4 percent. With the exception of a five-month period in 2020, the unemployment rate remained below five percent each month since 1987. At end of 2010, the state per capita income was ranked 17th in the nation, the biggest increase of any state in a decade from rank 38th. The reduction in the unemployment rate and growth in per capita income is attributable to the oil boom in the state. Due to a combination of oil-related development and investing in technology and service industries, North Dakota has had a budget surplus every year since the 2008 market crash.

Since 1976, the highest that North Dakota's unemployment rate has reached is just 6.2%, recorded in 1983. Every U.S. state except neighboring South Dakota has had a higher unemployment rate during that period.

Agriculture

North Dakota's earliest industries were fur trading and agriculture. Although less than 10% of the population is employed in the agricultural sector, it remains a major part of the state's economy. With industrial-scale farming, it ranks 9th in the nation in the value of crops and 18th in total value of agricultural products sold. Large farms generate the most crops. The share of people in the state employed in agriculture is comparatively high: , only two to three percent of the population of the United States is directly employed in agriculture. Between 2002 and 2007, total cropland increased by about a million acres (4,000 km2); North Dakota was the only state showing an increase. Over the same period,  were shifted into soybean and corn monoculture production, the largest such shift in the United States. Agriculturalists are concerned about too much monoculture, as it makes the economy at risk from insect or crop diseases affecting a major crop. In addition, this development has adversely affected habitats of wildlife and birds, and the balance of the ecosystem.

The state is the largest producer in the U.S. of many cereal grains, including barley (36% of U.S. crop), durum wheat (58%), hard red spring wheat (48%), oats (17%), and combined wheat of all types (15%). It is the second leading producer of buckwheat (20%). , corn became the state's largest crop produced, although it is only 2% of total U.S. production. The Corn Belt extends to North Dakota but is more on the edge of the region instead of in its center. Corn yields are high in the southeast part of the state and smaller in other parts of the state. Most of the cereal grains are grown for livestock feed.
The state is the leading producer of many oilseeds, including 92% of the U.S. canola crop, 94% of flax seed, 53% of sunflower seeds, 18% of safflower seeds, and 62% of mustard seed. Canola is suited to the cold winters and it matures fast. Processing of canola for oil production produces canola meal as a by-product. The by-product is a high-protein animal feed.

Soybeans are also an increasingly important crop, with  additional planted between 2002 and 2007. Soybeans are a major crop in the eastern part of the state, and cultivation is common in the southeast part of the state. Soybeans were not grown at all in North Dakota in the 1940s, but the crop has become especially common since 1998. In North Dakota soybeans have to mature fast, because of the comparatively short growing season. Soybeans are grown for livestock feed.

North Dakota is the second leading producer of sugarbeets, which are grown mostly in the Red River Valley. The state is also the largest producer of honey, dry edible peas and beans, lentils, and the third-largest producer of potatoes.

North Dakota's Top Agricultural Commodities (according to the USDA )

Energy

The energy industry is a major contributor to the economy. North Dakota has both coal and oil reserves. On average, the state's production of oil production grew at average annual rate of 48.4% from 2009-2018. During these years, oil production increased each year from 2009 to 2015, with 2016 marked by a slight decline and a return to growth since. Shale gas is also produced. Lignite coal reserves in Western North Dakota are used to generate about 90% of the electricity consumed, and electricity is also exported to nearby states. North Dakota has the second largest lignite coal production in the U.S. However, lignite coal is the lowest grade coal. There are larger and higher grade coal reserves (anthracite, bituminous coal and subbituminous coal) in other U.S. states.

Oil was discovered near Tioga in 1951, generating  of oil a year by 1984. Recoverable oil reserves have jumped dramatically recently.

The northwestern part of the state is the center of the North Dakota oil boom. The Williston, Tioga, Stanley and Minot-Burlington communities are having rapid growth that strains housing and local services.

The Great Plains region, which includes the state of North Dakota, has been referred to as "the Saudi Arabia of wind energy". Development of wind energy in North Dakota has been cost effective because the state has large rural expanses and wind speeds seldom go below .

Tourism
North Dakota is considered the least visited state, owing, in part, to its not having a major tourist attraction. 
Nonetheless, tourism is North Dakota's third largest industry, contributing more than $3 billion into the state's economy annually. Outdoor attractions like the 144-mile (232-km) Maah Daah Hey Trail and activities like fishing and hunting attract visitors. The state is known for the Lewis & Clark Trail and being the winter camp of the Corps of Discovery. Areas popular with visitors include Theodore Roosevelt National Park in the western part of the state. The park often exceeds 475,000 visitors each year.

Regular events in the state that attract tourists include Norsk Høstfest in Minot, billed as North America's largest Scandinavian festival; the Medora Musical; and the North Dakota State Fair. The state also receives a significant number of visitors from the neighboring Canadian provinces of Manitoba and Saskatchewan, particularly when the exchange rate is favorable.

International tourists now also come to visit the Oscar-Zero Missile Alert Facility.

Health care

North Dakota has six level-II trauma centers, 44 hospitals, 52 rural health clinics, and 80 nursing homes. Major provider networks include Sanford, St. Alexius, Trinity, and Altru.

Blue Cross Blue Shield of North Dakota is the largest medical insurer in the state. North Dakota expanded Medicaid in 2014, and its health insurance exchange is the federal site, HealthCare.gov.

North Dakota law requires pharmacies, other than hospital dispensaries and pre-existing stores, to be majority-owned by pharmacists. Voters rejected a proposal to change the law in 2014.

Culture

American Indian Nations

In the 21st century, North Dakota has an increasing population of Native Americans, who in 2010 made up 5.44% of the population. By the early 19th century the territory was dominated by Siouan-speaking peoples, whose territory stretched west from the Great Lakes area. The word "Dakota" is a Sioux (Lakota/Dakota) word meaning "allies" or "friends".

The primary historic tribal nations in or around North Dakota, are the Lakota and the Dakota ("The Great Sioux Nation" or "Oceti Sakowin", meaning the seven council fires), the Blackfoot, the Cheyenne, the Chippewa (known as Ojibwe in Canada), and the Mandan. There are six Indian reservations in North Dakota--Spirit Lake Tribe, Standing Rock Indian Reservation, Sisseton Wahpeton Oyate, Fort Berthold Indian Reservation, Turtle Mountain Indian Reservation, and The Mandan, Hidatsa, and Arikara Nation.

Pow wows

Social gatherings known as "powwows" (or wacipis in Lakota/Dakota) continue to be an important part of Native American culture and are held regularly throughout the state. Throughout Native American history, powwows were held, usually in the spring, to rejoice at the beginning of new life and the end of the winter cold. These events brought Native American tribes together for singing and dancing and allowed them to meet with old friends and acquaintances, as well as to make new ones. Many powwows also held religious significance for some tribes. Today, powwows are still a part of the Native American culture and are attended by Natives and non-Natives alike. In North Dakota, the United Tribes International Powwow held each September in the capital of Bismarck, is one of the largest powwows in the United States.

A pow wow is an occasion for parades and Native American dancers in regalia, with many dancing styles presented. It is traditional for male dancers to wear regalia decorated with beads, quills, and eagle feathers; male grass dancers wear colorful fringe regalia, and male fancy dancers wear brightly colored feathers. Female dancers dance much more subtly than male dancers. Fancy female dancers wear cloth, beaded moccasins, and jewelry, while the jingle dress dancer wears a dress made of metal cones. Inter-tribal dances during the powwow, allow everyone (even spectators) to take part in the dancing.

Norwegian and Icelandic influences

Around 1870 many European immigrants from Norway settled in North Dakota's northeastern corner, especially near the Red River. Icelanders also arrived from Canada. Pembina was a town of many Norwegians when it was founded; they worked on family farms. They started Lutheran churches and schools, greatly outnumbering other denominations in the area. This group has unique foods such as lefse and lutefisk. The continent's largest Scandinavian event, Norsk Høstfest, is celebrated each September in Minot's North Dakota State Fair Center, a local attraction featuring art, architecture, and cultural artifacts from all five Nordic countries. The Icelandic State Park in Pembina County and an annual Icelandic festival reflect immigrants from that country, who are also descended from Scandinavians.

Old World folk customs have persisted for decades in North Dakota, with the revival of techniques in weaving, silver crafting, and wood carving. Traditional turf-roof houses are displayed in parks; this style originated in Iceland. A stave church is a landmark in Minot. Norwegian-Americans constitute nearly one-third or 32.3% of Minot's total population and 30.8% of North Dakota's total population.

Germans from Russia

Ethnic Germans who had settled in Russia for several generations since the reign of Catherine the Great grew dissatisfied in the nineteenth century because of economic problems and because of the revocation of religious freedoms for Mennonites and Hutterites, in particular the revocation of exemption from military service in 1871. Most Mennonites and Hutterites migrated to America in the late 1870s. By 1900, about 100,000 had immigrated to the U.S., settling primarily in North Dakota, South Dakota, Kansas, and Nebraska. The south-central part of North Dakota became known as "the German-Russian triangle". By 1910, about 60,000 ethnic Germans from Russia lived in Central North Dakota. These individuals were Lutherans, Mennonites, Hutterites and Roman Catholics who had kept most of their German customs of the time when their ancestors immigrated to Russia. They were committed to agriculture. Traditional iron cemetery grave markers are a famous art form practiced by ethnic Germans.

Fine and performing arts

North Dakota's major fine art museums and venues include the Chester Fritz Auditorium, Empire Arts Center, the Fargo Theatre, North Dakota Museum of Art, and the Plains Art Museum. The Bismarck-Mandan Symphony Orchestra, Fargo-Moorhead Symphony Orchestra, Greater Grand Forks Symphony Orchestra, Minot Symphony Orchestra and Great Plains Harmony Chorus are full-time professional and semi-professional musical ensembles who perform concerts and offer educational programs to the community.

Entertainment

North Dakotan musicians of many genres include blues guitarist Jonny Lang, country music singer Lynn Anderson, jazz and traditional pop singer and songwriter Peggy Lee, big band leader Lawrence Welk, and pop singer Bobby Vee. The state is also home to Indie rock June Panic (of Fargo, signed to Secretly Canadian).

Hollywood and TV Star Angie Dickinson was born in Kulm and moved to Burbank, Ca as a ten year old. Ed Schultz was known around the country as the host of progressive talk radio show, The Ed Schultz Show, and The Ed Show on MSNBC. Shadoe Stevens hosted American Top 40 from 1988 to 1995. Josh Duhamel is an Emmy Award-winning actor known for his roles in All My Children and Las Vegas. Nicole Linkletter and CariDee English were winning contestants of Cycles 5 and 7, respectively, of America's Next Top Model. Kellan Lutz has appeared in movies such as Stick It, Accepted, Prom Night, and Twilight.

Cuisine

Sports

Bismarck was home of the Dakota Wizards of the NBA Development League, and currently hosts the Bismarck Bucks of the Indoor Football League.

North Dakota has two NCAA Division I teams, the North Dakota Fighting Hawks and North Dakota State Bison, and two Division II teams, the Mary Marauders and Minot State Beavers.

Fargo is home to the USHL ice hockey team the Fargo Force. Fargo is also the home of the Fargo-Moorhead RedHawks of the American Association.

The North Dakota High School Activities Association features more than 25,000 participants.

Outdoor activities such as hunting and fishing are hobbies for many North Dakotans. Ice fishing, skiing, and snowmobiling are also popular during the winter months. Residents of North Dakota may own or visit a cabin along a lake. Popular sport fish include walleye, perch, and northern pike.

The western terminus of the North Country National Scenic Trail is on Lake Sakakawea, where it abuts the Lewis and Clark Trail.

Media

The state has 10 daily newspapers, the largest being The Forum of Fargo-Moorhead. Other weekly and monthly publications (most of which are fully supported by advertising) are also available. The most prominent of these is the alternative weekly High Plains Reader.

The state's oldest radio station, WDAY-AM, was launched on May 23, 1922. North Dakota's three major radio markets center around Fargo, Bismarck, and Grand Forks, though stations broadcast in every region of the state. Several new stations were built in Williston in the early 2010s. North Dakota has 34 AM and 88 FM radio stations. KFGO in Fargo has the largest audience.

Broadcast television in North Dakota started on April 3, 1953, when KCJB-TV (now KXMC-TV) in Minot started operations. North Dakota's television media markets are Fargo-Grand Forks (117th largest nationally), including the eastern half of the state, and Minot-Bismarck (152nd), making up the western half of the state. There are currently 31 full-power television stations, arranged into 10 networks, with 17 digital subchannels.

Public broadcasting in North Dakota is provided by Prairie Public, with statewide television and radio networks affiliated with PBS and NPR. Public access television stations open to community programming are offered on cable systems in Bismarck, Dickinson, Fargo, and Jamestown.

Education

Higher education

The state has 11 public colleges and universities, five tribal community colleges, and four private schools. The largest institutions are North Dakota State University and the University of North Dakota.

The higher education system consists of the following institutions:

North Dakota University System (public institutions):

 Bismarck State College in Bismarck
 Dickinson State University in Dickinson
 Lake Region State College in Devils Lake
 Mayville State University in Mayville
 Minot State University in Minot
 Dakota College at Bottineau in Bottineau
 North Dakota State University in Fargo
 North Dakota State College of Science in Wahpeton & Fargo
 University of North Dakota in Grand Forks
 Valley City State University in Valley City
 Williston State College in Williston

Tribal institutions:

 Cankdeska Cikana Community College in Fort Totten
 Fort Berthold Community College in New Town
 Sitting Bull College in Fort Yates
 Turtle Mountain Community College in Belcourt
 United Tribes Technical College in Bismarck

Private institutions:

 University of Mary in Bismarck
 University of Jamestown in Jamestown
 Rasmussen College in Fargo
 Trinity Bible College in Ellendale

Primary and secondary education

There were 142 schools in North Dakota cities and 4,722 one room schools in the state in 1917. The urban schools had 36,008 students, and 83,167 students attended the one room schools. 1,889 of the one room schools closed between 1929 and 1954. In 1954 North Dakotan cities had 513 schools while 2,447 one room schools were in the state. At that time the urban schools had 94,019 students while the one room schools had 25,212 students. The Nation's Report Card ranks North Dakota fifteenth in the country in K-12 education based on standardized test scores.

Emergency services

The North Dakota Department of Emergency Services provides 24/7 communication and coordination for more than 50 agencies. In addition, "it administers federal disaster recovery programs and the Homeland Security Grant Program". In 2011, the Department selected Geo-Comm, Inc. "for the Statewide Seamless Base Map Project", which will facilitate "identifying locations 9–1–1 callers" and route emergency calls based on locations. In 1993 the state adopted the Burkle addressing system numbering rural roads and buildings to aid in the delivery of emergency services.

Transportation

Transportation in North Dakota is overseen by the North Dakota Department of Transportation. The major Interstate highways are Interstate 29 and Interstate 94, with I-29 and I-94 meeting at Fargo, with I-29 oriented north to south along the eastern edge of the state, and I-94 bisecting the state from east to west between Minnesota and Montana. A unique feature of the North Dakota Interstate Highway system is virtually all of it is paved in concrete, not blacktop, because of the extreme weather conditions it must endure. BNSF and the Canadian Pacific Railway operate the state's largest rail systems. Many branch lines formerly used by BNSF and Canadian Pacific Railway are now operated by the Dakota, Missouri Valley and Western Railroad and the Red River Valley and Western Railroad.

North Dakota's principal airports are the Hector International Airport (FAR) in Fargo, Grand Forks International Airport (GFK), Bismarck Municipal Airport (BIS), Minot International Airport (MOT) and Williston Basin International Airport (XWA) in Williston.

Amtrak's Empire Builder runs through North Dakota, making stops at Fargo (2:13 am westbound, 3:35 am eastbound), Grand Forks (4:52 am westbound, 12:57 am eastbound), Minot (around 9 am westbound and around 9:30 pm eastbound), and four other stations. It is the descendant of the famous line of the same name run by the Great Northern Railway, which was built by the tycoon James J. Hill and ran from St. Paul to Seattle.

Intercity bus service is provided by Greyhound and Jefferson Lines. Public transit in North Dakota includes daily fixed-route bus systems in Fargo, Bismarck-Mandan, Grand Forks, and Minot, paratransit service in 57 communities, along with multi-county rural transit systems.

Law and government

As with the federal government of the United States, political power in North Dakota state government is divided into three branches: executive, legislative, and judicial.

The Constitution of North Dakota and the North Dakota Century Code form the formal law of the state; the North Dakota Administrative Code incorporates additional rules and policies of state agencies.

In a 2020 study, North Dakota was ranked as the 8th easiest state for citizens to vote in.

Executive

The executive branch is headed by the elected governor. The current governor is Doug Burgum, a Republican who took office December 15, 2016, after his predecessor, Jack Dalrymple did not seek reelection. The current Lieutenant Governor of North Dakota is Brent Sanford, who is also the President of the Senate. The offices of governor and lieutenant governor have four-year terms, which are next up for election in 2024. The governor has a cabinet consisting of appointed leaders of various state government agencies, called commissioners. The other elected constitutional offices are secretary of state, attorney general, state auditor, and state treasurer.

Legislative

The North Dakota Legislative Assembly is a bicameral body consisting of the Senate and the House of Representatives. The state has 47 districts, each with one senator and two representatives. Both senators and representatives are elected to four-year terms. The state's legal code is named the North Dakota Century Code.

Judicial

North Dakota's court system has four levels, one of which is dormant. Municipal courts serve the cities. Decisions from municipal courts are generally appealable to district court. Most cases start in the district courts, which are courts of general jurisdiction. There are 42 district court judges in seven judicial districts. Appeals from final district court decisions are made to the North Dakota Supreme Court. An intermediate court of appeals was provided for by statute in 1987, but the North Dakota Court of Appeals has only heard 65 cases since its inception. The North Dakota Court of Appeals is essentially dormant, but capable of meeting if the North Dakota Supreme Court's case load necessitates the reestablishment of intermediate review.

Indian tribes and reservations

Historically, North Dakota was populated by the Mandan, Hidatsa, Lakota, and Ojibwe, and later by the Sanish and Métis. Today, five federally recognized tribes within the boundaries of North Dakota have independent, sovereign relationships with the federal government and territorial reservations:

 Mandan, Hidatsa, and Arikara Nation, Fort Berthold Reservation;
 Sisseton Wahpeton Oyate, Lake Traverse Indian Reservation;
 Standing Rock Sioux, Standing Rock Indian Reservation;
 Spirit Lake Tribe, Spirit Lake Reservation; and
 Turtle Mountain Band of Chippewa Indians, Turtle Mountain Reservation.

Federal

North Dakota's United States Senators are John Hoeven (R) and Kevin Cramer (R). The state has one at-large congressional district represented by Representative Kelly Armstrong (R).

Federal court cases are heard in the United States District Court for the District of North Dakota, which holds court in Bismarck, Fargo, Grand Forks, and Minot. Appeals are heard by the Eighth Circuit Court of Appeals based in St. Louis, Missouri.

Politics

MIT's Election Performance Index ranked North Dakota #1 in overall election administration policy and performance in the 2018, 2014, 2012, 2010, and 2008 elections. 

The major political parties in North Dakota are the Democratic-NPL and the Republican Party. , the Constitution Party and the Libertarian Party are also organized parties in the state.

At the state level, the governorship has been held by the Republican Party since 1992, along with a majority of the state legislature and statewide officers. Dem-NPL showings were strong in the 2000 governor's race, and in the 2006 legislative elections, but the League has not had a major breakthrough since the administration of former state governor George Sinner.

The Republican Party presidential candidate usually carries the state by a considerable margin; in 2020, Donald Trump won over 65% of the vote. Of all the Democratic presidential candidates since 1892, only Grover Cleveland (1892, one of three votes), Woodrow Wilson (1912 and 1916), Franklin D. Roosevelt (1932 and 1936), and Lyndon B. Johnson (1964) received Electoral College votes from North Dakota.

On the other hand, Dem-NPL candidates for North Dakota's federal Senate and House seats won every election between 1982 and 2008, and the state's federal delegation was entirely Democratic from 1987 to 2011. However, both of the current U.S. senators, John Hoeven and Kevin Cramer, are Republicans, as is the sole House member, Kelly Armstrong.

State taxes

North Dakota has a slightly progressive income tax structure; the five brackets of state income tax rates are 1.1%, 2.04%, 2.27%, 2.64%, and 2.90% as of 2017. In 2005 North Dakota ranked 22nd highest by per capita state taxes. The sales tax in North Dakota is 5% for most items. The state allows municipalities to institute local sales taxes and special local taxes, such as the 1.75% supplemental sales tax in Grand Forks. Excise taxes are levied on the purchase price or market value of aircraft registered in North Dakota. The state imposes a use tax on items purchased elsewhere but used within North Dakota. Owners of real property in North Dakota pay property tax to their county, municipality, school district, and special taxing districts.

The Tax Foundation ranks North Dakota as the state with the 20th most "business friendly" tax climate in the nation. Tax Freedom Day arrives on April 1, 10 days earlier than the national Tax Freedom Day. In 2006, North Dakota was the state with the lowest number of returns filed by taxpayers with an adjusted gross income of over $1M—only 333.

Notable people

 Lynn Anderson, country music singer.
 Sam Anderson, actor.
 Carmen Berg, Playboy Playmate, July 1987.
 Brian Bohrer, minister and author.
 Paula Broadwell, American writer, academic and former military officer
 James Buchli, former NASA astronaut.
 Quentin Burdick, former U.S. Senator, third longest-serving Senator among current members of this body.
 Warren Christopher, former U.S. Secretary of State, diplomat and lawyer.
 Shannon Curfman, American blues-rock guitarist and singer.
 Angie Dickinson, Golden Globe-winning television and film actress.
 Josh Duhamel, Emmy Award-winning actor and former male fashion model.
 Carl Ben Eielson, aviator, bush pilot and explorer.
 CariDee English, winner of Cycle 7 on America's Next Top Model. Host of Pretty Wicked.
 Louise Erdrich, Native American author of novels, poetry, and children's books.
 Darin Erstad, MLB all-star and World Series Champion.
 Travis Hafner, Former MLB Designated Hitter for the Cleveland Indians.
 Richard Hieb, former NASA astronaut.
 Clint Hill, United States Secret Service agent who was in the presidential motorcade during the assassination of John F. Kennedy.
 Virgil Hill, former WBA World Cruiserweight champion and Olympic boxer.
 Phil Jackson, former basketball coach who won 11 NBA championships in his coaching career.
 David C. Jones, 9th chairman of the U.S. Joint Chiefs of Staff.
 Gordon Kahl, tax protester best known for the Medina shootout in 1983.
 Chuck Klosterman, writer, journalist, critic, humorist, and essayist whose work often focuses on pop culture.
 Louis L'Amour, author of primarily Western fiction.
 Jonny Lang, Grammy-winning blues guitarist and singer.
 Peggy Lee, jazz and traditional pop singer and songwriter.
 Nicole Linkletter, winner of Cycle 5 on "America's Next Top Model".
 Kellan Lutz, actor who portrays Emmett Cullen in Twilight and New Moon. Former male fashion model.
 Roger Maris, right fielder in Major League Baseball and former single season home run record holder.
 Connor McGovern, professional football player for the Denver Broncos and the New York Jets.
 Cara Mund, Miss America 2018.
 Thomas McGrath, poet and political activist.
 Michael H. Miller, 61st Superintendent of the United States Naval Academy
 Griffin Neal, professional football player for the New Orleans Saints.
 Mancur Olson, economist.
 Alan Ritchson, participant in 3rd season of American Idol, singer, model and actor.
 Sakakawea, who joined Lewis and Clark on their expedition.
 Ed Schultz, host of The Ed Schultz Show.
 Eric Sevareid, CBS news journalist.
 Ann Sothern, Oscar nominated film and television actress.
 Richard St. Clair, Harvard-educated composer of modern classical music.
 Shadoe Stevens, host of American Top 40.
 Bobby Vee, pop music singer.
 Lawrence Welk, musician, accordion player, bandleader, and television impresario.
 Carson Wentz, professional football player for the Indianapolis Colts.

See also
 Index of North Dakota-related articles
 Outline of North Dakota

Notes

References

Bibliography

 Arends, Shirley Fischer. The Central Dakota Germans: Their History, Language, and Culture. (1989). 289 pp.
 Berg, Francie M., ed. Ethnic Heritage in North Dakota. (1983). 174 pp.
 Blackorby, Edward C. Prairie Rebel: The Public Life of William Lemke (1963), a radical leader in 1930s online edition
 Collins, Michael L. That Damned Cowboy: Theodore Roosevelt and the American West, 1883–1898 (1989). 
 Cooper, Jerry and Smith, Glen. Citizens as Soldiers: A History of the North Dakota National Guard. (1986). 447 pp.
 Crawford, Lewis F. History of North Dakota (3 vol 1931), excellent history in vol 1; biographies in vol. 2–3
 Danbom, David B. "Our Purpose Is to Serve": The First Century of the North Dakota Agricultural Experiment Station. (1990). 237 pp.
 Eisenberg, C. G. History of the First Dakota-District of the Evangelical-Lutheran Synod of Iowa and the Other States. (1982). 268 pp.
 Ginsburg, Faye D. Contested Lives: The Abortion Debate in an American Community (1989). 315 pp. the issue in Fargo
 Hargreaves, Mary W. M. Dry Farming in the Northern Great Plains: Years of Readjustment, 1920–1990. (1993). 386 pp.
 Howard, Thomas W., ed. The North Dakota Political Tradition. (1981). 220 pp.
 Hudson, John C. Plains Country Towns. (1985). 189 pp. geographer studies small towns
 Junker, Rozanne Enerson. The Bank of North Dakota: An Experiment in State Ownership. (1989). 185 pp.
 Lamar, Howard R. Dakota Territory, 1861–1889: A Study of Frontier Politics (1956).
 Lounsberry, Clement A. Early history of North Dakota (1919) excellent history by an editor of Bismarck Tribune; 645pp online edition
 Lysengen, Janet Daley and Rathke, Ann M., eds. The Centennial Anthology of "North Dakota History: Journal of the Northern Plains" (1996). 526 pp. articles from state history journal covering all major topics in the state's history
 Morlan, Robert L. Political Prairie Fire: The Nonpartisan League, 1915–1922. (1955). 414 pp. NPL comes to power briefly
 Peirce, Neal R. The Great Plains States of America: People, Politics, and Power in the Nine Great Plains States (1973) excerpt and text ssearch, chapter on North Dakota
 Robinson, Elwyn B., D. Jerome Tweton, and David B. Danbom. History of North Dakota (2nd ed. 1995) standard history, by leading scholars; extensive bibliography
 Robinson, Elwyn B. History of North Dakota (1966) First edition online
 Schneider, Mary Jane. North Dakota Indians: An Introduction. (1986). 276 pp.
 Sherman, William C. and Thorson, Playford V., eds. Plains Folk: North Dakota's Ethnic History. (1988). 419 pp.
 Sherman, William C. Prairie Mosaic: An Ethnic Atlas of Rural North Dakota. (1983). 152 pp.
 Smith, Glen H. Langer of North Dakota: A Study in Isolationism, 1940–1959. (1979). 238 pp. biography of influential conservative Senator
 Snortland, J. Signe, ed. A Traveler's Companion to North Dakota State Historic Sites. (1996). 155 pp.
 Stock, Catherine McNicol. Main Street in Crisis: The Great Depression and the Old Middle Class on the Northern Plains. (1992). 305pp. online edition
 Tauxe, Caroline S. Farms, Mines and Main Streets: Uneven Development in a Dakota County. (1993). 276 pp. coal and grain in Mercer County
 Tweton, D. Jerome and Jelliff, Theodore B. North Dakota: The Heritage of a People. (1976). 242 pp. textbook history
 Wilkins, Robert P. and Wilkins, Wynona Hachette. North Dakota: A Bicentennial History. (1977) 218 pp. popular history
 Wishart, David J. ed. Encyclopedia of the Great Plains, University of Nebraska Press, 2004, . complete text online; 900 pages of scholarly articles
 Young, Carrie. Prairie Cooks: Glorified Rice, Three-Day Buns, and Other Reminiscences. (1993). 136 pp.

Primary sources

 Benson, Bjorn; Hampsten, Elizabeth; and Sweney, Kathryn, eds. Day In, Day Out: Women's Lives in North Dakota. (1988). 326 pp.
 Maximilian, Prince of Wied. Travels in the Interior of North America in the rears 1832 to 1834 (Vols. XXII-XXIV of "Early Western Travels, 1748–1846", ed. by Reuben Gold Thwaites; 1905–1906). Maximilian spent the winter of 1833–1834 at Fort Clark.
 the University of North Dakota, Bureau of Governmental Affairs, ed., A Compilation of North Dakota Political Party Platforms, 1884–1978. (1979). 388 pp.
 WPA. North Dakota: A Guide to the Northern Prairie State (2nd ed. 1950), the classic guide online edition

External links

 
 USGS real-time, geographic, and other scientific resources of North Dakota
 North Dakota State Guide, from the Library of Congress
 U.S. Census Bureau facts of North Dakota
 North Dakota State Facts—USDA
 NETSTATE Geography
 
 

 
1889 establishments in the United States
Midwestern United States
States and territories established in 1889
States of the United States
Contiguous United States